Lauracha is a 1946 Argentine drama film directed by Arturo García Buhr, Ernesto Arancibia, Antonio Ber Ciani and Enrique Cahen Salaberry  and starring Amelia Bence and García Buhr. The film was adapted for the screen by Hugo Mac Dougall, based on the Uruguayan novel of the same name by Otto Miguel Cione, which was originally published in 1906.

Cast
 Amelia Bence
 Arturo García Buhr
 Nelo Cosimi
 Pilar Gómez
 Ilde Pirovano
 María Santos
 Malisa Zini

Production
Problems arose during the production of the film at the Pampa Film studio which resulted in three main directors working on the film: Ernesto Arancibia, Enrique Cahen Salaberry and Arturo Garacía Buhry. The exteriors were filmed more than a year earlier by Arancibia and Cahen Salaberry, and the film was finished by Garcia Buhr, working with director Antonio Ber Ciani. It was adapted from the 1906 novel by Uruguyan author Otto Miguel Cione for the screen by Hugo Mac Dougall. Cinematographer Pablo Tabernero was brought in to shoot the picture and it was edited by Kurt Land and Gerardo Rinaldi. Isidro Maiztegui composed the score to Lauracha, and art direction was by Saulo Benavente.

Release and reception
The film premiered on 11 October 1946. Noticias Gráficas noted the performances of Amelia Bence and  Arturo García Buhr, while El Heraldo del Cinematografista  opined that the film was an improvement on the book, while retaining a sense of style and the antiquated climate of the early 20th century period.

References

External links
 

1946 films
1946 drama films
Argentine drama films
1940s Spanish-language films
Argentine black-and-white films
Films directed by Arturo García Buhr
Films directed by Ernesto Arancibia
Films directed by Antonio Ber Ciani
Films directed by Enrique Cahen Salaberry